More Street Dreams, Pt. 2: The Mixtape is Fabolous' first official mixtape released on November 4, 2003. It debuted No. 28 on the Billboard 200 and No. 8 on the Billboard Top R&B/Hip-Hop Albums chart.

Track listing

Personnel
Fabolous - Vocal, Producer, Executive Producer
DJ Clue - Producer, Executive Producer
DURO - Producer, Executive Producer
DJ Scratchator - Producer
Mr. Fingaz - Producer
Needlz - Producer
Paul Gregory - Engineer
Suzanne Burge - Product Manager
Anita Marisa Boriboon - Art Direction
Godfrey Lopez - Art Direction
Sherry Clardy - Artist Coordination

Charts

Fabolous albums
2003 mixtape albums
Atlantic Records compilation albums
Sequel albums